IndusInd Bank Limited is an Indian financial services headquartered in Mumbai (Maharashtra). The bank offers commercial, transactional and electronic banking products and services. IndusInd Bank was inaugurated in April 1994 by then Union Finance Minister Manmohan Singh. IndusInd Bank is the first among the new-generation private banks in India.

The bank started its operations with ₹100 crores (1 billion) in capital, of which ₹60 crores were raised by Indian residents and ₹40 crores were raised by Non-Resident Indians (NRI). The bank specializes in retail banking services and is also working on expanding its network of branches all across the country. According to the bank, its name is derived from the Indus Valley civilisation.

IndusInd Bank, which commenced operations in 1994, caters to the needs of both consumer and corporate customers Its technology platform supports multi-channel delivery capabilities. As on September 30, 2021, IndusInd Bank has 2,015 Branches/Banking Outlets and 2,886 ATMs spread across 760 geographical locations of the country. The Bank also has representative offices in London, Dubai and Abu Dhabi. The Bank believes in driving its business through technology. It enjoys clearing bank status for both major stock exchanges – BSE and NSE – and major commodity exchanges in the country, including MCX, NCDEX and NMCE. IndusInd Bank was included in the NIFTY 50 benchmark index on April 1, 2013.

History 
The bank began its operations on 17 April 1994 under the chairmanship of S. P. Hinduja with the primary objective of serving the NRI community.

Board of directors  
Sumant Kathpalia was appointed  as Managing Director and CEO with effect from March 2020 for a period of three years.

Arun Tiwari is the current chairman of the board. The other members on the board are Rajiv Agarwal, Kanchan Chitale, Shanker Annaswamy, T. T. Ram Mohan, Akila Krishnakumar, Arun Tiwari, and Siraj Chaudhry.

Banking services 

 Branch banking
 Consumer finance
 Corporate banking and finance
 Commercial and transaction banking
 Cash Management Services (CMS)
 Trade Services Utility (TSU)
 Depository operations
 Treasury operations
 Wealth management

See also

 Banking in India
 List of banks in India
 Reserve Bank of India
 Indian Financial System Code
 List of largest banks
 List of companies of India
 Make in India

Notes
 The term 'new-generation' refers to banks established after the Reserve Bank of India issued updated licensing guidelines for new private sector banks in 1993.

References

Banks established in 1994
Banks based in Mumbai
1994 establishments in Maharashtra
NIFTY 50
BSE SENSEX
IndusInd Bank
Indian companies established in 1994
Companies listed on the National Stock Exchange of India
Companies listed on the Bombay Stock Exchange